The action of 15 July 1805 was a small naval action that took place off Chausey, on the coast of Normandy, involving two British gun-brigs on one side, and vessels on the other. The becalmed gun-brigs became easy targets for the oar-powered gunboats, which were able to manoeuver as to overpower them and force their surrender. Also, the French vessels were armed with guns, which outranged the carronades that constituted the bulk of the British gunboat's armament.

Battle 
In July 1805 , together with her sister-ship , were part of the Royal Navy force blockading the coat of northern France. On 15 July the two gun-brigs were off Granville, Manche when they became becalmed. To avoid the tide carrying them onto the coast, the two anchored in the afternoon off Chausey.

The news that the gun-brigs were anchored off Chausey was carried to Commander Joseph Collet, commanding officer of the 1st gunboat division of the Boulogne Flotilla stationed in Granville. Collet departed Granville on 15 July at 21:00, leading seven gunboats and a dogger, or six gunboats, a schooner, and a ketch.

A heavy fog came up and at 2:30 am on 16 July, several French vessels were seen to emerge from the darkness. Plumper attempted to get closer to Teazer so that they could support each other, but was unable to so. The French force, which consisted of six brigs, a schooner, and a ketch, stood off and battered Plumper with their guns. Plumper returned fire, but being armed primarily with carronades, was outranged. During the exchange of fire, Lieutenant James Henry Garrety, Plumpers captain, had an arm shot off, a leg crippled by grapeshot, and his chest lacerated by a piece of langrage. Four seamen were also wounded. After an hour, Sub-Lieutenant Richards, who had taken over command after Garrety had been taken below, struck. Later, some of Plumpers crew accused Richards of having too quickly surrendered.

Having overpowered Plumper, Collet anchored his vessels to give his rowers some rest. After daybreak, Collet pressed his attack on Teazer, which struck at 7:30am.

Aftermath 
The French took the two badly damaged gun-brigs into Granville. Plumper in particular was in a sinking condition, and barely reached Granville before she ran aground. Collet was slightly wounded by a splinter, but otherwise there were no reported casualties.

Plumper was brought into service in the French Navy, where she served until 1827; from 1815 on her name was Argus. Teazer was also commissioned in the French Navy, and served under the same name until  and  recaptured her on 15 August 1811.

Notes, citations, and references

Notes

Citations

References

 

 
 
Winfield, Rif & Stephen S Roberts (2015 Forthcoming) French Warships in the Age of Sail 1786 - 1862: Design Construction, Careers and Fates. (Seaforth Publishing). 

Naval battles of the Napoleonic Wars
Naval battles involving France
Naval battles involving the United Kingdom
Conflicts in 1805
Napoleon's planned invasion of the United Kingdom
1805 in France
War of the Third Coalition
Battles of the War of the Third Coalition
July 1805 events